The Sunset Strip is the  stretch of Sunset Boulevard that passes through the city of West Hollywood, California. It extends from West Hollywood's eastern border with the city of Los Angeles near Marmont Lane  to its western border with Beverly Hills at Phyllis Street. The Sunset Strip is known for its boutiques, restaurants, rock clubs, and nightclubs, as well as its array of huge, colorful billboards.

History
 

Prior to the 1984 incorporation of the city of West Hollywood, the Sunset Strip lay in an unincorporated area of Los Angeles County. Because of this, the Sunset Strip and all of West Hollywood gained a reputation for being a loosely regulated area, in large part because it was not under the jurisdiction of the Los Angeles Police Department.

1920s 
Gambling was illegal in the city of Los Angeles, but legal in unincorporated Los Angeles County, which fostered the development of rather wilder nightlife in West Hollywood than was found within the city limits. In the 1920s a number of nightclubs and casinos moved in along Sunset Strip, which attracted movie people; alcohol was served in back rooms during Prohibition.

1930s and 1940s 

In the 1930s and the 1940s, restaurants and nightclubs on Sunset Strip, like Sherry's, Ciro's, the Mocambo and the Trocadero, were patronized by people working in the movie industry. Some of its expensive nightclubs and restaurants were said to be owned by gangsters like Mickey Cohen and Bugsy Siegel, earning Sunset Strip a place in Raymond Chandler's 1949 Philip Marlowe novel, The Little Sister. Also on Sunset Strip are the Garden of Allah apartments—Hollywood quarters for transplanted writers like Robert Benchley, Dorothy Parker, and F. Scott Fitzgerald—and Schwab's Drug Store.

1960s 

By the early 1960s, Sunset Strip had lost favor with the majority of movie people, but its restaurants, bars and clubs continued to serve as an attraction for locals and tourists. In the mid-1960s it became a major gathering place for the counterculture and was the scene of the Sunset Strip curfew riots in November 1966, involving police and crowds of young club-goers. Those riots inspired the Buffalo Springfield song "For What It's Worth".

Sunset Strip became popular with rock musicians and their fans. Bands such as Led Zeppelin, The Doors, The Byrds, Love, The Seeds, Frank Zappa, and others played at clubs like Gazzari's, the Whisky a Go Go, the Roxy, Pandora's Box and the London Fog. In July 1965 Go-Go dancers also began performing.  The Hyatt West Hollywood (now known as the Andaz West Hollywood) became a popular hotel.

1970s 

Rodney Bingenheimer's English Disco, influenced by Britain's glam rock movement, opened in 1972. It became a hangout for musicians, including The Stooges and the New York Dolls. Clubs on the Sunset Strip at that time, Rodney Bingenheimer's and the Starwood in particular, were notorious for allowing teenage patrons. "Nobody carried or cared about ID's. Thirteen-year-old girls could walk in dressed like sexy 25-year-olds, and kids could saddle up to the bar and order a cocktail, so it wasn't a big stretch for us to get up and play there", recalled Quiet Riot founder Kelly Garni. The 1979 Donna Summer song "Sunset People", from the album Bad Girls, was about the nightlife on Sunset Boulevard. Sunset Strip continued to be a major focus for punk rock and new wave music during the late 1970s.

1980s 

During the latter part of the 1970s and well into the 1980s, the Sunset Strip would become synonymous with the Los Angeles heavy metal movement, commonly referred to as the West Coast Metal Explosion. The clubs on the Sunset Strip such as the Starwood, Whisky a Go Go, and The Roxy, became home to numerous LA-based heavy metal bands such as Van Halen, Quiet Riot, Mötley Crüe, Ratt and Guns N' Roses. The scene became synonymous with glam metal, with many fans mimicking the hair and clothing worn by the bands. The many heavy metal fans who would congregate outside the clubs along the strip became a defining feature.

The adoption of "pay to play" policies, in which bands were charged a fee to play at clubs, diminished its appeal to groups, other than as an industry showcase. As of the 2010s, the music industry establishment continues to dominate the clubs on Sunset Strip.

In November 1984, voters in West Hollywood passed a proposal on the ballot to incorporate, and the area became an independent city. Increasingly, the western end of Sunset Strip was occupied by office buildings, mostly catering to the entertainment industry, as well as hotels.

1990s 
During the 1990s, the center of the alternative music activity in Los Angeles shifted further east to areas like Echo Park, Silver Lake and Los Feliz.

Landmarks

In popular culture
77 Sunset Strip, a 1958–1964 TV series, was set on Sunset Strip between La Cienega Boulevard and Alta Loma Road, although the address was fictional, as street numbers there run in the 7000s to 8000s. A second crime drama, Dan Raven, starring Skip Homeier, aired on NBC during calendar year 1960, also set on Sunset Strip. Dan Raven featured several celebrities appearing as themselves, including Bobby Darin, Marty Ingels, and Paul Anka. The 1979 film Hardcore had scenes from Sunset Strip when George C. Scott's character Jake Van Dorn flew to Los Angeles to find his missing teenage daughter.

Studio 60 on the Sunset Strip was a behind-the-scenes television drama of a late-night comedy sketch show performed at a fictional theater on Sunset Strip.

Premiering on January 27, 2006, in Los Angeles at Vanguard Hollywood, the Rock of Ages stage production inspired the 2012 film of the same name. Its story line is centered along Sunset Strip in 1987.

The 2010 film Burlesque is set at a fictional neo-Burlesque club on Sunset Strip.

The opening credits of the HBO TV series Entourage featured shots of Sunset Strip.

The video game Grand Theft Auto V features a parody of the Whisky-a-Go-Go, named Tequi-la-la, a bar established in Eclipse Blvd, in the fictional city of Los Santos, based on Los Angeles.

Los Angeles-based artist Edward Ruscha created the artist's book Every Building on the Sunset Strip in 1966, later 12 Sunsets website for the Getty Research Institute.

Explanatory notes

References

Citations

General bibliography

External links

  – official site

Sunset Boulevard (Los Angeles)
Entertainment districts in California
History of Los Angeles
Landmarks in Los Angeles
Neighborhoods in West Hollywood, California
Westside (Los Angeles County)